A hogan ( or ; from Navajo  ) is the primary, traditional dwelling of the Navajo people. Other traditional structures include the summer shelter, the underground home, and the sweat house. A hogan can be round, cone-shaped, multi-sided, or square; with or without internal posts; timber or stone walls and packed with earth in varying amounts or a bark roof for a summer house, with the door facing east to welcome the rising sun for wealth and good fortune.

Today, while some older hogans are now still used as dwellings and others are maintained for ceremonial purposes, new hogans are rarely intended as family dwellings.

Traditional structured hogans are also considered pioneers of energy efficient homes. Using packed mud against the entire wood structure, the home was kept cool by natural air ventilation and water sprinkled on the dirt ground inside. During the winter the fireplace kept the inside warm well into the night. This concept is called thermal mass.

Modern application and revival

The preference of hogan construction and use is still very popular among the Navajos, although the use of it as a home shelter dwindled through the 1900s, due mainly to the requirement by many Navajos to acquire homes built through government and lender funding – which largely ignored the hogan-style and cultural needs of a community – in preference for HUD-standardized construction.

With government and lender requirements requiring low costs, as well as bathrooms and kitchens, the hogan as a person's home was dwindling away, save for those who could build their own. That began to officially change in the late 1990s with various small projects to find ways to bring the hogan back. In 2001, it began changing significantly with a joint-venture of a partnership involving the Navajo Nation, Northern Arizona University, the US Forest Service and other private and public partners – to begin manufacturing and building log hogans from a Navajo-majority owned log home factory in Cameron, Arizona, next to the Cameron Chapter House. Using surplus small-diameter wood being culled out of the Northern Arizona forests to mitigate devastating wildfires, and with a series of meetings between elders, medicine men, and project leaders – a log hogan revival is being born on the Navajo Nation. While keeping the sacred space of the hogan relatively untouched, and also meeting the requirements for modern home amenities, an ancient tradition is now once again beginning to flourish. Along with assuring the survival of a cultural heritage, this project has also created new jobs, summer school construction experience for Navajo teens, public buildings, and much more.

In other languages
These terms are possible Native American sources of the current term hogan:
  in Navajo
 gowąh (Western Apache)
 guughą or kuughą (Chiricahua)

See also

Wigwam
Earth lodge
Longhouse

References

External links 
 

Indigenous architecture
Traditional Native American dwellings
Navajo culture
Semi-subterranean structures